Kevin Clarke is an English playwright and screenwriter of film and television.

Early life
Kevin Clarke spent his early childhood in care. He grew up in Birkenhead, Merseyside and left school at 16 to work as a guitarist. Later he studied Drama at Bretton Hall, Leeds. He taught in London for five years, writing in the evenings. He directed his first play The Jackpot at the Finborough Theatre; as a result he was invited to join the first BBC Television Writers training course and commissioned to write for the BBC TV series Casualty.

Career
His subsequent theatre play Translantic written with Josh Goldstein ran for three months at the Dramatis Personae Theater in New York City, and his third, Charity's Child played the Riverside Studios. His original comedy screenplay, Albert and the Lion was produced by ITV. He has written more than 150 episodes of television drama, including scripts for Minder, Wish Me Luck, Doctor Who, Wycliffe, The Inspector Lynley Mysteries and The Last Detective. He was a principal writer on The Bill for five years where he created the cult character Roxanne. He wrote the original scripts for the forthcoming feature films Faithfull and Money To Burn.

Kevin Clarke later gained an Open University degree in History, then read History as a postgraduate at Oxford. He gained a subsequent MA in Renaissance Studies at Birkbeck, University of London.

References

External links

 

Living people
British male dramatists and playwrights
British science fiction writers
British television writers
English dramatists and playwrights
English male dramatists and playwrights
English television writers
English screenwriters
English male screenwriters
British male television writers
Year of birth missing (living people)